Arasht (also Romanized as Aresht; also known as Harish and Kharish) is a village in Chavarzaq Rural District, Chavarzaq District, Tarom County, Zanjan Province, Iran. At the 2006 census, its population was 488, in 143 families.

References 

Populated places in Tarom County